Colin Blackburn, Baron Blackburn, was a distinguished Scottish judge renowned for his mastery of the common law During his illustrious career, he served as a judge in the Court of Exchequer Chamber, where he demonstrated his exceptional legal knowledge and acumen.

Notably, on 16 October 1876, Baron Blackburn made history by becoming the first individual to be appointed as a law lord under the provisions of the newly enacted Appellate Jurisdiction Act. This was a significant milestone in the development of the British legal system, and Baron Blackburn's appointment was a testament to his unparalleled expertise and contribution to the field of law.

Baron Blackburn's legacy continues to endure, as he remains widely regarded as one of the greatest legal minds of his time. His profound impact on the common law is a testament to his exceptional skill, knowledge, and dedication to the pursuit of justice.

Life
He was the second son of John Blackburn of Killearn, Stirlingshire, and Rebecca, daughter of the Rev. Colin Gillies. He was born on 18 May 1813. His elder brother, Peter Blackburn, represented Stirlingshire in the conservative interest in the parliament of 1859–65. His younger brother was the mathematician Hugh Blackburn. The future judge was educated at the Edinburgh Academy, Eton and Trinity College, Cambridge, in which university he graduated B.A. (eighth wrangler) in 1835, and proceeded M.A. in 1838. In 1870, he received the honorary degree of LL.D. from the University of Edinburgh. Admitted on 20 April 1835, student at Lincoln's Inn, he migrated thence to the Inner Temple, where he was called to the bar on 23 November 1838, and elected honorary bencher on 13 April 1877.
 
For some years after his call, he went the northern circuit in a briefless or almost briefless condition. He had no professional connection, no turn for politics, no political interest, and none of the advantages of person and address which make for success in advocacy.  During this period employed himself in reporting and editing, with T. F. Ellis, eight volumes of the respected Ellis and Blackburn reports. Though his well-earned repute as a legal author led to his occasional employment in weighty mercantile cases, he was still a stuff gownsman, and better known in the courts as a reporter than as a pleader, when on the transference of Sir William Erle from the Queen's Bench to the chief-justiceship of the common pleas, Lord Campbell startled the profession by selecting him for the vacant puisne judgeship. He was appointed justice on 27 June 1859, and on 2 November following, was invested with the coif. He was knighted on 24 April 1860. The surprise with which his advancement was received was proved by the event to have been singularly ill-founded.

Judge

It was soon apparent that the new puisne judge possessed in an eminent degree all the essential qualities of the judicial mind. To a logical faculty, naturally acute and improved by severe discipline, he added a depth of learning, a breadth of view, a sobriety of judgment, and inexhaustible patience, which made his decisions as nearly as possible infallible. Few causes célèbres came before him during his seventeen-year tenure of office as judge of first instance, but the dignity and impartiality with which he presided at the trial (28 October 1867) of the Manchester Fenians were worthy of a more august occasion, and his charge to the grand jury of Middlesex (2 June 1868) on the bill of indictment against the late governor of Jamaica, Edward John Eyre, though not perhaps altogether unexceptionable, is, on the whole, a sound, weighty, and vigorous exposition of the principles applicable to the determination of a question of great delicacy and the gravest imperial consequence.

Only once was his judicial ability seriously questioned: this was an attack on him in an extraordinary letter to The Times in 1877 by the bitter-tongued Irish judge Jonathan Christian, who chose to treat Blackburn's reversal of one of his judgments as a personal affront. Christian was notorious for quarrelling with his Irish colleagues, and thought poorly of the ability of even the most distinguished of them (notably Lord O'Hagan, who sat with Blackburn on the appeal and joined with him in reversing Christian's decision) so his attack on Blackburn need not be taken seriously (it has been suggested that O'Hagan was the real target of his indignation).

The consolidation of the courts effected by the Judicature Acts of 1873 and 1875 gave Blackburn the status of justice of the high court, which numbered among its members no judge of more tried ability when the Appellate Jurisdiction Act of 1876 authorised the reinforcement of the House of Lords by the creation of two judicial life peers, designated "lords of appeal in ordinary". 
Blackburn's investiture with the new dignity met accordingly with universal approbation. He was raised to the life peerage on 10 October 1876, by the title of Baron Blackburn, of Killearn in the County of Stirlingshire, and took his seat in the House of Lords and was sworn of the privy council in the following month (21, 28 November) In the part which he thenceforth took in the administration of our imperial jurisprudence, Blackburn acquitted himself with an ability so consummate as to cause his retirement in December 1886 to be felt as an almost irreparable loss. The regret was intensified by the discovery of a curious flaw in the Appellate Jurisdiction Act, by which his resignation of office carried with it his exclusion from the House of Lords. This anomaly was, however, removed by an amending act. He died, unmarried, at his country seat, Doonholm, Ayrshire, on 8 January 1896.

Career
Blackburn was a member of the royal commissions on the courts of law (1867) and the stock exchange (1877), and presided over the royal commission on the draft criminal code (1878). He was the author of a masterly Treatise on the Effect of the Contract of Sale on the Legal Rights of Property and Possession in Goods. Wares, and Merchandise, London, 1845, 8vo, which held its own as the standard textbook on the subject until displaced by the more comprehensive work of Benjamin. A new edition, revised by J. C. Graham, appeared in 1885. As a reporter Blackburn collaborated with Thomas Flower Ellis.

Though greatly respected he does not seem to have been popular. According to a well-known story, he informed a colleague that he intended to retire in vacation to avoid the trouble of a retirement dinner – the colleague cheerfully replied that this was quite unnecessary since no one would have turned up to the dinner anyway.

He was the author of a valuable work on the Law of Sales.<ref>'The Times, 10 January 1896; E Manson, Builders of our Law (1904).</ref>

Judgments

The following is a list of some of the cases in which Lord Blackburn gave judgment:

Queen's BenchTweddle v Atkinson (1861) 1 B&S 393, 121 ER 762, privity and considerationTaylor v Caldwell (1863) 3 B & S 826, frustrationR v Nelson and Brand (1867)Rylands v Fletcher [1868] UKHL 1, seminal strict liability caseSmith v Hughes (1871) LR 6 QB 597, objective interpretation of conduct in contracts and mistakesHarris v Nickerson (1873) LR 8 QB 286, offer and acceptance at auctionsR v Negus (1873) LR 2 CP 34, definition of control of workerJackson v Union Marine Insurance (1874) 10 Common Pleas 125, contractual terminationAshbury Railway Carriage and Iron Co Ltd v Riche (1875) LR 7 HL 653, company objects clausesPoussard v Spiers and Pond (1876) 1 QBD 410, contractual termination and wrongful dismissal

House of LordsBrogden v Metropolitan Railway Company (1876–77) LR 2 App Cas 666Hughes v Metropolitan Railway Co (1877) 2 AC 439, promissory estoppelOrr-Ewing v Colquhoun (1877)Erlanger v New Sombrero Phosphate Co (1878) 3 App Cas 1218Pharmaceutical Society v London and Provincial Supply Association (1880)Speight v Gaunt (1883–84) LR 9 App Cas 1Foakes v Beer'' [1884] UKHL 1, [1881-85] All ER Rep 106, (1884) 9 App Cas 605; 54 LJQB 130; 51 LT 833; 33 WR 233 – a leading case on the legal concept of consideration involving part payment of debt as consideration.

Other notable cases in which Lord Blackburn delivered judgment:
Glyn Mills & Co v East and West India Dock Co (1882) 7 App. Cas. 591

Arms

References

Attribution:

External links
 
 

1813 births
1896 deaths
People educated at Eton College
Alumni of Trinity College, Cambridge
Law lords
Members of the Judicial Committee of the Privy Council
People educated at Edinburgh Academy
People from the Scottish Borders
Scottish legal writers
English legal writers
Justices of the King's Bench
Queen's Bench Division judges
Members of the Privy Council of the United Kingdom
Knights Bachelor
19th-century Scottish judges
Life peers created by Queen Victoria